Switchblade is the debut album by Schaft, released in 1994. A promotional video for the song "Arbor Vitate" was filmed, and was later re-used by PIG for their version of the song.

Track listing

Personnel
Maki Fujii – electronic devices, computer programming, acoustic piano, noises
Hisashi Imai – guitars, noises, vocals (2)
Raymond Watts – computer programming, guitars, noises, vocals (2–3, 5–6, 11–13)

Additional personnel
Susanne Bramson – vocals (10)
Julianne Regan – vocals (7)
Jonny Stephens (Meat Beat Manifesto) – vocals (9)
Lynne Hobday – spoken word (1)
Steve White – guitars (5)
CRA¥ (The Mad Capsule Market's) – bass (12)
Morota Koh (Doom) – bass (9)
Keith LeBlanc – drums (3, 11)
Motokatsu (The Mad Capsule Market's) – drums (12)
Seiichi Teratani – drums (2)
DJ Peah – scratching (9)
Kazutoshi Yokoyama – manipulation assisting (2, 6, 8)
Michiru Ōshima – orchestral arrangement (7)

All tracks arranged by Schaft, except 1, 4, 7 (Fujii), 6 (Imai), 8 (Imai, Watts).

The song "Broken English" on this album is a Marianne Faithfull cover, and is the music accompanying the original version of the first trailer of Hellsing Ultimate as shown at Anime Expo 2005. The track was later used in the series as an insert song for episode 5.

References

1994 debut albums
Schaft albums
Victor Entertainment albums